Sela pri Dolenjskih Toplicah is a village southwest of Dolenjske Toplice in the historical region of Lower Carniola in Slovenia. The Municipality of Dolenjske Toplice is included in the Southeast Slovenia Statistical Region.

Name
The name of the settlement was changed from Sela to Sela pri Dolenjskih Toplicah in 1953.

References

External links
Sela pri Dolenjskih Toplicah on Geopedia

Populated places in the Municipality of Dolenjske Toplice